Gastrophryne olivacea, the Great Plains narrow-mouthed toad or western narrow-mouthed toad, is a species of microhylid frog found throughout much of the south-central United States from Nebraska south through Texas, and into northern Mexico. Though not a true toad, it is often referred to as such because it is terrestrial.

Description 

Great Plains narrow-mouthed toads are a small (1.5 in), flat-bodied species, with a sharply pointed snout. They are typically olive green to grey-brown in color, sometimes with black blotching. Their undersides are lighter colored.  Their skin secretions can cause severe, burning pain if they get into eyes.

Behavior and habitat 
This toad is found in a wide range of habitats, but most frequently on moist ground or in leaf litter, and under rocks or fallen logs. They breed throughout the spring and summer in pools of water left by rainfall. Their primary diet is ants.

Taxonomy 
Gastrophryne olivacea was once considered a subspecies of the eastern narrowmouth toad, G. carolinensis.

There are no valid subspecies of this taxon at this time.
This taxon was originally divided into two subspecies but in 2012 the western subspecies was elevated to full species status ("Gastrophryne mazatlanensis" = the Sinaloan Narrow-mouthed Toad).

References

External links 
Gastrophryne olivacea in Amphibiaweb.org
Herps of Texas: Gastrophryne olivacea
Amphibian Species of the World: Gastrophryne olivacea

Gastrophryne
Fauna of the Plains-Midwest (United States)
Amphibians of the United States
Amphibians described in 1856